CENADEP (Centre National d’Appui au Développement et à la Participation populaire) is an environmental federation of the 
Democratic Republic of the Congo. CENADEP was founded in 2000.
The spokesman is Baudouin Hamuli Kabaruza.

External links
Official site

Nature conservation in the Democratic Republic of the Congo